Thomas Bullock is the name of:

Thomas Bullock (Mormon) (1816–1885), English Mormon pioneer, clerk and historian of the Church of Jesus Christ of Latter-day Saints
Thomas Bullock (musician), English musician and former member of electroclash group A.R.E. Weapons
Thomas Bullock (priest) (1694–1760), Anglican dean